Prison minister may refer to:

 Minister of State for Prisons (UK)
 Minister for Prisons (Western Australia)

See also 
 Prison religion